The Bihar Soccer League, also known as Bihar State Soccer League, is the top tier state level football league in the Indian state of Bihar, conducted by Bihar Football Association with Shirsh Sports Pvt Ltd.

All matches are being played on 3 venues: Motihari, Patna and Muzaffarpur. The 3,000-capacity Khudiram Bose Stadium is the stadium in Muzaffarpur.

Clubs 
A  total of 7 teams are participating in the league for the first edition in 2021–22.

See also 
 Bihar Football Association

References 

Football leagues in India